Dinsdale is a railway station on the Tees Valley Line, which runs between  and  via . It is owned by Network Rail and managed by Northern Trains.

History
The station was opened by the North Eastern Railway on 1 July 1887. It is closely linked with the history of the Stockton and Darlington Railway, having opened as a replacement for the nearby .

The station was named after the village of Low Dinsdale, Borough of Darlington, which is commonly referred to as Dinsdale. In the early nineteenth century, the station served Dinsdale Spa.

Facilities
A number of station improvements took place in the mid–2010s, including the installation of new CCTV cameras, new shelters, seating, passenger information screens and announcements, resurfaced platform areas and clearer signage at the station entrance.

Services

As of the May 2021 timetable change, the station is served by two trains per hour between Saltburn and Darlington via Middlesbrough, with one train per hour extending to Bishop Auckland. An hourly service operates between Saltburn and Bishop Auckland on Sunday. All services are operated by Northern Trains.

Rolling stock used: Class 156 Super Sprinter and Class 158 Express Sprinter

References

External links
 
 

Railway stations in the Borough of Darlington
DfT Category F2 stations
Former North Eastern Railway (UK) stations
Railway stations in Great Britain opened in 1887
Northern franchise railway stations